Shilluk (natively Dhøg Cøllø or d̪ɔ́cɔ̀llɔ̀) is a language spoken by the Shilluk people of South Sudan and Sudan. It is closely related to other Luo languages. The term Shilluk is a pronunciation of Arabic origin.

Phonology

Vowels 

Each of these vowels also exists in a long form and an overlong form which are phonemic.

Advanced and retracted tongue root 
Shilluk, like most Nilotic languages, differentiates vowels according to their place of articulation. They are either pronounced with advancement of the root of the tongue or with retraction of the root of the tongue. Gilley uses the terms "extended larynx" or "blown vowel".

Consonants

Tone 
Shilluk has a rich inventory of tones, with at least seven distinctive tone patterns or tonemes.

There are three level tonemes: Low, Mid and High. In addition, there are four contours – the Rise and three falling configurations: Fall, High Fall and Late Fall. These are denoted by the following diacritics:

Orthography 
A Latin alphabet was developed for Shilluk by Christian missionaries in the early 20th century. There are 29 characters in Shilluk orthography; 10 vowels and 19 consonants.

Syllable structure 
Uninflected native stem syllables are overwhelmingly monosyllabic. With few exceptions, these monosyllabic stems typically consist of an onset, a vowel (nucleus), and a coda. Their structure is as follows:

C (Cj/w) V (V) (V) C

Grammar

Morphology
Monosyllabic stems give rise to polysyllabic words through processes of derivation or inflection. For verbs and nouns alike, the most common prefixes are /a- ʊ-/, and the most common suffixes are /-Cɪ -ɪ -a (-ɔ)/. Further, alternations of vowel length and tone play an important part in inflectional morphology.

Verbs

Transitive verb classes 
Shilluk transitive verbs have a phonological root that consists of a single closed syllable of the form /C(j/w)V(V)C/. "That is, the root vowel is either short or long, and clustering of consonants is restricted to the onset, where either of the semivowels /w,j/ may follow another consonant." There are seven classes distinguished by alternations in terms of vowel length and tone.

Nouns 
Noun inflection is characterised by head marking: pertensive and construct-state are both inflections that mark the head, not the dependent. For example, English has a person's rodent, where the head is rodent and the possessive marking is on the dependent person's. In contrast, Shilluk has a pertensive affix on the head (e.g., dúup = "rodent", dû́uup = "rodent belonging to").

Number is marked, but no predictable system has been identified. Instead, there are over 140 different patterns of number marking on nouns.

Numerals in Shilluk are nouns.

Sample text

References 

Luo languages
Languages of Sudan
Languages of South Sudan